Mayor of St Peters may refer to 

 Mayor of St Peters (New South Wales) between 1871 and 1948.
 Mayor of St Peters (South Australia) between 1885 and 1997

See also
 List of New South Wales state by-elections